Seitovka is a rural locality (a selo) and the administrative center of Seitovsky Selsoviet, Krasnoyarsky District, Astrakhan Oblast, Russia. The population was 477 as of 2010. There are 18 streets.

Geography 
Seitovka is located 35 km northwest of Krasny Yar (the district's administrative centre) by road. Buzan-Pristan is the nearest rural locality.

References 

Rural localities in Krasnoyarsky District, Astrakhan Oblast